Maaren Olander-Doyle (born 10 October 1975) is an Estonian former footballer and referee who played as a goalkeeper for the Estonia women's national team.

Career
Olander-Doyle played in the first ever official match for Estonia, against Lithuania. Following her retirement from playing, she coached the Estonia national team and was head coach for the under-19 team at one point. She also became a football referee, gaining elite status in 2008.

Personal life
Aside from her career in football, she has also played tennis, indoor hockey and has practised gymnastics. Since 2013, she has lived in Dubai.

References

1975 births
Living people
Women's association football goalkeepers
Estonian women's footballers
Estonia women's international footballers
Estonian football referees
Women association football referees
Footballers from Tallinn